Mariano Albert-Ferrando (born 26 April 1982) is a former professional tennis player from Spain.

Albert-Ferrando, a right-handed player, made his only ATP Tour main draw appearance at the 2002 Majorca Open. He featured in the main draw as a qualifier and was beaten in the first round by Magnus Norman.

In 2003 he won a Challenger tournament in Sassuolo, beating Renzo Furlan in the final.

Challenger titles

Singles: (1)

References

External links
 
 

1982 births
Living people
Spanish male tennis players
21st-century Spanish people